Alessandro Andreozzi (born 2 June 1991) is an Italian motorcycle racer. He currently competes in the CIV Superbike Championship aboard a Yamaha YZF-R1. He has competed in the CIV Moto2 Championship, where he was champion in 2011, the Moto2 World Championship, the Supersport World Championship, the FIM Superstock 1000 Cup and the Superbike World Championship.

Career statistics

Grand Prix motorcycle racing

By season

Races by year
(key) (Races in bold indicate pole position, races in italics indicate fastest lap)

Supersport World Championship

Races by year
(key)

Superbike World Championship

Races by year

References

External links
 

Italian motorcycle racers
Living people
1991 births
Moto2 World Championship riders
Supersport World Championship riders
People from Macerata
FIM Superstock 1000 Cup riders
Superbike World Championship riders
Sportspeople from the Province of Macerata